Joe Rand Beckett (March 2, 1891 – July 28, 1969) was an American veteran of World War I, prominent lawyer in Indianapolis, Indiana, and a member of the Indiana Senate representing Johnson County and Marion County in 1929, 1931 and the special session in 1932 as well as assistant attorney general for the state. Shortly thereafter, he led the drive to build modern housing for low income residents of Indianapolis to improve conditions in the city.

Early life

Family and background
Joe Rand Beckett was born the son of Wymond Joe Beckett and Florence Ohio Rand in Indianapolis on March 2, 1891. His grandfather, Joe Smirthwinte Beckett was from Sheffield, England, and settled in Dearborn County, Indiana, in about 1837. His mother was the granddaughter of Thomas Rand, an immigrant from Belfast, Ireland, who fought in the Revolutionary War and settled in Dearborn County in about 1811.

Beckett graduated from Emmerich Manual High School in Indianapolis in 1910 and graduated from the University of Illinois in 1914, where he studied architecture. He attended a predecessor of the now Indiana University Robert H. McKinney School of Law and was admitted to the bar in 1916. Shortly thereafter, he partnered with his father and they formed the law practice of Beckett and Beckett in Indianapolis.

Family Tragedy
Joe Rand Beckett and his wife had only one child, Joe Rand Beckett Jr., who was born on May 6, 1918. According to newspaper reports, he was a bright, talented youth who was about to attend the Culver Military Academy in the Fall. Near dusk on May 29, 1932, while his parents were out of town in Oxford, Ohio, he was accidentally shot and killed by a playmate with a 38 caliber pistol.

Military service
A veteran of World War I, Mr. Beckett attended the first officers' training camp at Fort Benjamin Harrison in 1917, when he was commissioned a first lieutenant. He was promoted to captain of artillery and served overseas. Active in the American Legion, he was past commander of the McIlvaine-Kothe Post. He also served as state legislative chairman of the Legion. He was an army reserve officer for several years advancing to the rank of major.

Philanthropy
Joe Rand and Mary Ann Beckett are recognized by the Laura Githens Society of the Indianapolis Zoo for including them in their estate plans.

Legacy
Lockefield Gardens

The headline in the Indianapolis Times in early September 1933 came as a surprise to most residents of the Hoosier capital: "$4,460,000 Loan Will Help City to Banish Slums." The accompanying story, datelined Washington, D.C., explained that tentative approval had been given for federal funds to "finance elimination of slums and construction of low-cost housing units in the Indianapolis Negro section." The proposed program, noted the reporter, had been "put through without publicity" by a planning committee of the Indianapolis Chamber of Commerce, "the representatives of which manipulated secretly to obtain the approval of the federal works board."

Precise details are lacking, but available evidence suggests that perhaps as early as fall 1932, and certainly by spring 1933, some Indianapolis residents were discussing housing conditions and what might be done to improve them in the Hoosier capital. One such individual was Joe Rand Beckett, a local architect and attorney, who, as his obituary put it years later, "pioneered in the building of modern housing for low-income groups". As a member of the board of directors of the Indianapolis Chamber of Commerce, Beckett reported in mid-May 1933 to his colleagues "on the progress to date of the Planning and Housing Committee," of which he was the chairman. —Robert G Barrows (June 2007)

Joe Rand Beckett was the Chairman of the Housing and Planning Committee and board member of the Indianapolis Chamber of Commerce instrumental in obtaining the loan for Indianapolis during the New Deal era during Franklin Delano Roosevelt's presidency.

See also
Nicholson-Rand House

Notes

Joe Rand Beckett's wife, Mary Ann Baker died at the age of 105 years on January 14, 1996.

Lineage: Proof of war records by Brumbraugh-pp. 186, 265: D.A.R. no. 147661. IN 25 Abstract of Graves of Revolutionary Patriots, Vol.3, p. Serial: 8542; Volume: 4.

References

External links

Politicians from Indianapolis
United States Army officers
Burials at Crown Hill Cemetery
Indiana Republicans
Philanthropists from Indiana
Businesspeople from Indianapolis
1891 births
1969 deaths
American United Methodists
20th-century American philanthropists
20th-century American businesspeople
20th-century Methodists
 American people of English descent
 American people of Irish descent
University of Illinois Urbana-Champaign alumni
Indiana University Robert H. McKinney School of Law alumni